Making Money is a 2007 British novel by Terry Pratchett.

Making Money may also refer to:

 "Making Money", a 1940 short film by Indian filmmaker Ezra Mir
 "Making Money", a song from Ben Rector's 2013 album The Walking in Between

See also
 Make Money, a 1996 album by E.U.
 Made of Money (disambiguation)